Kirill Semyonovich Serebrennikov (born 7 September 1969) is a Russian stage and film director and theatre designer. Since 2012, he has been the artistic director of the Gogol Center in Moscow. He is one of Russia's leading theatre and cinema directors and winner of numerous international awards.

In 2017 he was arrested for alleged embezzlement of the state funds given to the Seventh Studio, a cultural institution he headed. Serebrennikov spent almost 2 years under house arrest. A key witness confessed that she made accusations under pressure from the investigators, and the judge was changed. Media, international cultural community and human rights activists unanimously considered the case politically motivated and fabricated because Serebrennikov was known for his liberal and LGBT-friendly stances that opposes Russian official conservative positions. In June 2020, Serebrennikov was sentenced guilty and given three years of probation. In March 2022 the sentence was cancelled.

Biography

Family and early years 
Serebrennikov was born in Rostov-on-Don, Russian SFSR to a Jewish father and a Ukrainian mother. His father was a surgeon, while his mother was a teacher of Russian language and literature. Having graduated from Rostov State University with majors in physics in 1992. Serebrennikov had no formal theatre education prior to his stage director debut in 1994. Kirill’s grandfather Alexander Ivanovich Litvin was a film director and screenwriter, he worked at Moldova-Film in (1953–1972) and was titled an Honored Culture Worker of the Moldavian Soviet Socialist Republic. 

As recalled by his mother, Serebrennikov was drawn to theater as early as in kindergarten age. He studied at the math school, in the 8th grade he established his own student theater and staged a play called ‘Shadow’.

Career 

Serebrennikov made his first steps as a professional director as early as in 1990. In 1998 he emerged as a film director. In 2001, he staged his first production in Moscow. Serebrennikov has staged ‘Plastilin’ at the Centre of Drama and Directing. Later he worked Moscow Chekhov Theatre, Latvian National Theatre, Theatre of Nations. He has been active in opera staging productions for the Mariinsky Theatre, and the Bolshoi Theatre in Russia, where he has also been a stage director and a designer for a ballet, Komische Oper Berlin and Stuttgart Opera in Germany.

In 2006 Serebrennikov became an art director of the ‘Territory’ International Festival. Since 2008, he is a professor of the Moscow Art Theatre School, where he has a class of actors and directors. His productions have been presented at the Wiener Festwochen, and the Avignon Theatre Festival. His films have been screened at Cannes Film Festival, Locarno Film Festival, Rome Film Festival, and the Warsaw International Film Festival where his film Yuri's Day (2008) received the Grand Prix. His film The Student (2016) was awarded a prize in the Un Certain Regard section at the Cannes Film Festival. In 2009 Serebrennikov launched the Platforma art incubator, a platform that supported theatre projects around Russia. By 2015, more than 340 projects were staged and released.

In 2011 Serebrennikov staged Rimsky-Korsakov’s ‘The Golden Cockerel’ for the Bolshoi. The play received wide acclaims and was perceived by many as a ‘biting satire’ on Kremlin.

In 2012, he was appointed artistic director of The Gogol Center. Under Serebrennikov it evolved into the world-renowned center of liberal art. However, many peers criticized the new director for his edginess and running against the conservative course led by Russian authorities.

For TV, Serebrennikov directed more than 100 commercials, two documentaries, 11 music videos and three TV series. In 2006-2007 Serebrennikov hosted ‘Drugoe Kino’ (‘Other Cinema’) TV show at the TV3 channel. In 2007 he hosted a talk-show ‘’ at the STS (TV channel).

In 2016 his version of the ‘Barber of Seville’ was premiered at the Komische Oper Berlin.

Three plays of Serebrennikov were awarded at the Festival d’Avignon: ‘The Idiots’, ‘Dead Souls’ and ‘Outside’ (2019). In 2019 he staged ‘Nasha Alla’ (‘Our Alla’), a tribute to the Russian Prima Donna Alla Pugacheva.

Arrest and prosecution 

On 23 May 2017, Serebrennikov's apartment and the Gogol Center facilities were raided by law enforcement agents in connection with an alleged embezzlement at the Seventh Studio. While initially no charges against Serebrennikov have been filed, some of Russia's most prominent cultural figures saw the publicized raid of his apartment as a political gesture, discouraging Serebrennikov and others from criticizing the government. Serebrennikov had criticised the 2014 Russian annexation of Crimea and has spoken out in support of Russia’s LGBT community. Vladimir Urin, and Yevgeny Mironov, among others, in May 2017 expressed their support of Serebrennikov in a letter passed on to Russian President Vladimir Putin at a public function. In July 2017 Serebrennikov's premiere of the ballet ‘Nureyev’ in Bolshoi was cancelled at the last minute.

On 22 August 2017, Serebrennikov was detained by the Investigative Committee of Russia, suspected of masterminding a fraud scheme involving a state subsidy of almost 129 million rubles (about $1.9 million) the Seventh Studio received from the government of Russia for the ‘Platforma’ project from 2011 to 2014. Serebrennikov has been placed under house arrest until 19 October. Seventh Studio former director Yuri Itin has already been placed under house arrest since 31 May 2017. Ex-chief accountant of Seventh Studio, Nina Maslyaeva, gave confessions and has been held in custody since then. Serebrennikov refused any accusations and called the charges laughable. According to him, all the money was spent for the theater that thrived and became a world-renowned institution. On August 23, 2017, hundreds of people gathered in front of the courthouse protesting against arrest. The case received significant media coverage and was unanimously perceived as politically motivated. Colleagues told the media that Serebrennikov was hated by many officials for his views. 34 prominent artists and cultural workers pledged to guarantee Serebrennikov’s bail payment. More than 3500 artists signed a letter of support asking the Culture Ministry to drop charges from the director. The prosecutors asked for six years in prison.

During Serebrennikov’s house arrest, in December 2017 his ballet ‘Nureev’ was premiered at the Bolshoi. Later, in 2018, the ballet received the ‘Benois de la Danse’ award.

The trial was called Kafkaesque in the media and unanimously perceived as a political mock by Serebrennikov supporters. Though the ‘Platform’ bookkeeping was indeed sloppy, the prosecutors tried to claim that the play ‘A Midsummer Night's Dream’ was never staged, though it was actually released, played abroad and won numerous international awards. Key witness of prosecution Eleonora Filimonova later told the court that she was pressured and threatened by the investigators. The house arrest was prolonged several times. After 18 months, in June 2020, Serebrennikov was convicted and given three years of probation and a three-year ban on leading any cultural institution with governmental support. He was also required to pay a fine of 800,000 roubles. Itin and Maslyaeva were also sentenced to probation.

On November 12, 2021, Serebrennikov repaid 129 mln roubles claimed as compensation by the Culture Ministry. In February 2021, Serebrennikov was fired from the Gogol Centre.

On March 28, 2022, the court canceled the suspended sentence taking into account that all financial damage was repaid and Serebrennikov received a positive profile during his term. The travel ban was lifted and Kirill was able to leave Russia.

Private life
Serebrennikov is openly gay and an activist of LGBT cause.

Further work 

Serebrennikov worked fruitfully even during the home arrest: he watched videos from rehearsals, recorded the comments and sent them to cast with the help of his lawyers. That way he managed to release Mozart’s “Così Fan Tutte” in Zurich and Verdi’s “Nabucco” in Hamburg. In 2020 his 'Decamerone' was shown in Berlin. In 2018 his movie Leto about Russian rock legends Viktor Tsoi and Mike Naumenko entered the main competition of the Cannes Film Festival. In April 2021 Wagner’s “Parsifal” premiered in the Vienna State Opera.

Serebrennikov opposed 2022 Russian Invasion of Ukraine. For this, Bolshoi canceled his ballet ‘Nureyev’.

In March 2022 Serebrennikov was chosen to open the 76th Festival d’Avignon. His new play ‘The Black Monk’ premiered at the Festival in July 2022.

His film Petrov's Flu (2021) received the Vulcan award for best cinematography at Cannes Film Festival.

In May 2022 Serebrennikov became the only Russian director to participate in the Cannes Film Festival with his film Tchaikovsky's Wife.

Europe Theatre Prize 
In 2017 he was awarded the XIV Europe Prize Theatrical Realities, in Rome, with the following motivation:Author, screenwriter, playwright, stage and film director, professor of theatre, inventor of innovative solutions in scenography, architect of new theatre spaces, teacher and instructor, Kirill Serebrennikov is the artistic director of the Gogol Centre, Moscow, where he also teaches at the School of Theatre Arts. His wide-ranging activities can be explained in part by the fact that he has no specific theatre or film training: instead he has a master’s degree in physics. Often taken for a provocateur, what he shows in his work comes essentially from his open mentality, his vision, his many talents and a way of lateral thinking, that of a scientist or a true artist, who knows how to assess and understand reality in order to critically distil its fundamental aspects, and contribute to its transformation by letting the anxieties of our time find expression.

Filmography

Films
 Undressed (1998)
 Ragin (2004)
 Playing the Victim (2006)
 Yuri's Day (2008)
 Crush: 5 Love Stories (2009)
 Betrayal (2012)
 The Student (2016)
 Leto (2018)
 Petrov's Flu (2021)
 Tchaikovsky's Wife (2022)
 Limonov, the Ballad of Eddie (2023)
 The Disappearance (TBA)

Television
 Rostov-Papa (2001), 10 episodes
 The Murderer’s Diary (2002), 12 episodes
 The Golovlyov Family (2006), based on Mikhail Saltykov-Shchedrin's eponymous novel.
 Bed Stories (2003)

Awards 
 Europe Prize Theatrical Realities sponsored by European Commission (2017)
Ordre des Arts et des Lettres (2018);
Person of the Year in 2018 (Association of Theatre Critics) and 2019 (GQ)

References 

1969 births
Living people
Moscow Art Theatre
Academic staff of Moscow Art Theatre School
Prix Benois de la Danse winners
Recipients of the Nika Award
Russian film directors
Russian music video directors
Russian opera directors
Russian theatre directors
Russian activists against the 2022 Russian invasion of Ukraine
Russian people of Ukrainian descent

External links